Lasiopetalum schulzenii, commonly known as drooping velvet-bush, is a species of flowering plant in the family Malvaceae and is endemic to southern continental Australia. It is a shrub with heart-shaped leaves and small groups of hairy white and reddish-brown flowers.

Description
The grey-green foliage is covered in fine hair, which is particularly prominent on new growth. Flowering occurs from September to February, the cymes bearing from five to twelve five-pointed star-shaped flowers  in diameter. Flowering is followed by round hairy fruit  in diameter.

Taxonomy
Drooping velvet-bush was first formally described in 1855 by Ferdinand von Mueller who gave it the name Corethrostylis schulzenii in his book Definitions of rare or hitherto undescribed Australian plants, later published in the Transactions of the Philosophical Society of Victoria. In 1863, George Bentham changed the name to Lasiopetalum schulzenii in Flora Australiensis. The specific epithet (schulzenii) honours the 19th century botanist Ludwig F. Schulzen.

Distribution and habitat
Lasiopetalum schulzenii grows on clifftops and in woodland and heath in the south-east of South Australia, including on Kangaroo Island and near Port Campbell and Portland south-western Victoria, where it is rare. It grows on alkaline sands, and is associated with Eucalyptus diversifolia subsp. megacarpa.

Use in horticulture
Lasiopetalum schulzenii has potential in horticulture, the compact foliage and flowering are features. It tolerates well-drained soils in sun or part-shaded aspect. It is frost hardy and can tolerate extended dry periods. Propagation is by seed or cutting. It has also been classified as somewhat fire retardant.

References

Malvales of Australia
Flora of South Australia
Flora of Victoria (Australia)
schulzenii
Taxa named by Ferdinand von Mueller
Plants described in 1855